The 1986 New Orleans Saints season was the team's 20th as a member of the National Football League. They improved upon their previous season's output of 5–11, winning seven games.

Offseason

Organizational changes 
On January 14, owner Tom Benson hired Jim Finks as the franchise's general manager, and turned over the entire football operation to the veteran operative who previously built championship clubs with the Minnesota Vikings and Chicago Bears. Two weeks later, Finks hired Jim Mora as the new head coach. Mora was the most successful coach in the history of the United States Football League, leading the Philadelphia/Baltimore Stars to two USFL championships and a runner-up finish.

NFL Draft

Personnel

Staff

Roster

Schedule 

Note: Intra-division opponents are in bold text.

Week 1

Week 2

Standings

References 

New Orleans Saints seasons
New Orleans
New